Burg Dürnstein is a castle near the municipality Neumarkt in Steiermark in the district Murau of the state of Styria in Austria.

See also
List of castles in Austria

References

This article was initially translated from the German Wikipedia.

Castles in Styria